Monika Chabel (born 10 May 1992) is a Polish representative rower. She is a dual Olympian and an Olympic medalist.

Personal
Ciaciuch was born in the small village of Ślesin, Kuyavian-Pomeranian Voivodeship which has a population of about 1500. In October 2017 she married a Polish rower Wiktor Chabel.

Rowing career
Ciaciuch competed in the women's quadruple sculls event at the 2016 Summer Olympics, winning the bronze medal. In 2021 she raced in the Polish coxless four at the Tokyo 2020 Olympics. That crew made the Olympic final and finished in sixth place.

References

External links
 

1992 births
Living people
Polish female rowers
Olympic rowers of Poland
Rowers at the 2016 Summer Olympics
Rowers at the 2020 Summer Olympics
Medalists at the 2016 Summer Olympics
Olympic bronze medalists for Poland
Olympic medalists in rowing
Sportspeople from Kuyavian-Pomeranian Voivodeship
People from Nakło County
World Rowing Championships medalists for Poland